In computational geometry, the cone algorithm is an algorithm for identifying the particles that are near the surface of an object composed of discrete particles.  Its applications include computational surface science and computational nano science. The cone algorithm was first described in a publication about nanogold in 2005.

The cone algorithm works well with clusters in condensed phases, including solid and liquid phases. It can handle the situations when one configuration includes multiple clusters or when holes exist inside clusters. It can also be applied to a cluster iteratively to identify multiple sub-surface layers.

References
 Yanting Wang, S. Teitel, and Christoph Dellago (2005), Melting of Icosahedral Gold Nanoclusters from Molecular Dynamics Simulations.  Journal of Chemical Physics vol. 122, pp 214722–214738.

External links
Cone Algorithm — Generic surface particle identification algorithm, Yanting Wang.

Molecular modelling software
Geometric algorithms